Cymatonycha is a genus of longhorn beetles of the subfamily Lamiinae, containing the following species:

 Cymatonycha castanea Bates, 1874
 Cymatonycha fasciata Chemsak & Noguera, 1993
 Cymatonycha meridionalis Martins & Galileo, 1995

References

Desmiphorini